Carcer can refer to:
Carcer Dun, a villain of the Discworld series
Geomantic figures, a collection of sixteen figures from western geomancy, one of which is Carcer
Carcer City, a fictional city in the Manhunt, Manhunt 2 and Grand Theft Auto series of video games
Càrcer, a municipality in the province of Valencia, Spain, also known as Cárcer.
Carcer, the name for an ancient Roman prison